The Herrmann pass (also Herrmann shift) is a sleight of hand move used to control cards. This style of the move is different from the Classic Pass.

The sleight is named after Alexander Herrmann or his brother Compars (Carl) Herrmann and one of the earliest publications of the move was in Stanyon’s Serial Lessons in Conjuring. This is supposed to be Herrmann’s actual handling of the move.

In 1897, a version was published as an Invisible Turnover Pass for the first time, by Roterberg.

The Herrmann pass differs from the Classic Pass as it is the bottom packet which is taken to the top, not the top packet that is taken to the bottom. There are numerous variations of this pass.

According to the Austrian magician Magic Christian, author of Non Plus Ulta — Hofzinser's Card Artistry, the Herrmann pass is erroneously named after Alexander Herrmann or his brother Compars (Carl) Herrmann. In reality, Johann Nepomuk Hofzinser was the inventor of the sleight. In his book, where the pass is explained in detail, Christian writes "It is hoped that, after the publication of this book, the Herrmann pass will come to be correctly known as the Hofzinser pass."

Card tricks
Sleight of hand